Events from the year 1547 in India.

Events
 Piploda princely state is established

Births
 September 24 – Faizi, Malik-ush-Shu'ara (poet laureate) of Akbar's Court. (died 1595)

Deaths
 Raghunatha Siromani, philosopher and logician (born 1477) (died 1547)
 Meerabai, Hindu mystic poet and devotee of Krishna (born year unknown in Kurki) (died 1547 in Dwarka)

See also

 Timeline of Indian history

References